The Book of Air and Shadows is a thriller novel by Michael Gruber published in 2007.

Plot summary
Set concurrently in the 17th century and the current century, the novel is an intriguing and complex thriller based around the mystery of William Shakespeare. Jake Mishkin, a lonely and troubled lapsed Catholic intellectual property lawyer (though he is generally assumed to be Jewish-American despite his Waffen SS Officer grandfather)  teams up with a young man, Albert Crosetti, who has taken a job at an antiquarian bookstore in the hope of saving enough to fund his studies at NYU film school.  Together they hunt for Shakespeare's elusive lost manuscript.

References

2007 American novels
American thriller novels
Fiction set in the 1600s